Krishna Chandra was an Indian politician.  He was elected to the Lok Sabha, the lower house of the Parliament of India from the Jalesar, Uttar Pradesh constituency of Uttar Pradesh as a member of the Indian National Congress.

References

External links
 Official Biographical Sketch in Lok Sabha Website

1895 births

Indian National Congress politicians
Year of death missing
India MPs 1957–1962